Jakubowicz may refer to :

People 
 Andrew Jakubowicz, a Jewish Australian academic currently serving as Professor of Sociology at the University of Technology Sydney.
 Andrzej Jakubowicz (born 1958), Polish former international table tennis player.
 Karol Jakubowicz (died 2013), Polish academic.
 Rafał Jakubowicz (born 1974), Polish visual artist and art critic.

Other 
 Izaak Jakubowicz Synagogue

See also 
 Jakubowice (disambiguation) (toponym)
 Jakubovice (Czech toponym)

Polish-language surnames
Jewish surnames
Patronymic surnames
Surnames from given names